"Neodictya jakovlevi" is an invalid name for a species of fly in the family Sciomyzidae. It is found in the Palearctic.

The fly genus name Neodictya Elberg, 1965 is a junior primary homonym of the planthopper genus name Neodictya Synave, 1965, and permanently invalid under the rules of the ICZN.

References

Sciomyzidae
Insects described in 1965
Controversial taxa